The 2015 Kick Start Energy Ginetta Junior Championship was a multi-event, one make motor racing championship held across England and Scotland. The championship featured a mix of professional motor racing teams and privately funded drivers, aged between 14 and 17, competing in Ginetta G40s that conformed to the technical regulations for the championship. It formed part of the extensive program of support categories built up around the British Touring Car Championship centrepiece. It was the ninth Ginetta Junior Championship, and commenced on 4 April 2015 at Brands Hatch – on the circuit's Indy configuration – and concluded on 11 October 2015 at the same venue, utilising the Grand Prix circuit, after twenty races held at ten meetings, all in support of the 2015 British Touring Car Championship season.

Teams and drivers

Race calendar

Calendar changes
 After using the "International" circuit configuration in 2014, the Oulton Park round reverted to the "Island" layout for 2015.

Championship standings

Drivers' championship
A driver's best 18 scores counted towards the championship, with any other points being discarded.

References

External links
 
 Ginetta Junior Series News

Ginetta Junior Championship season
Ginetta Junior Championship seasons